Flashbacks of a Fool is a 2008 British drama film about a Hollywood actor who, following the death of his childhood best friend, reflects upon his life and what might have been, had he stayed in England. The film was directed by Baillie Walsh, and stars Daniel Craig, Harry Eden, Claire Forlani, Felicity Jones, Emilia Fox, Eve, Jodhi May, Helen McCrory and Miriam Karlin.

Plot
Joe Scot is a British actor living in Los Angeles whose once successful Hollywood career is flagging and spends most of his time drinking, doing drugs and having one-night stands. The only person he has in his life is his personal assistant Ophelia who is growing tired of his antics. He receives a call from his mother to say his childhood best friend Boots has died unexpectedly. Shaken by the news, he attends a disastrous meeting with an up-and-coming director and his agent. Joe learns he will not get the part he had hoped would restore his career and publicly berates his agent who responds by telling Joe he is washed up before quitting. Upset, Joe walks to the beach and swims out to sea contemplating suicide. Floating in the waves, he thinks back to the final summer holiday he spent with Boots.

The story flashes back to a teenage Joe and Boots. Joe lives with his mother, aunt and younger sister Jesse in a small town on the English coast. Boots has epilepsy and has recently had an attack in the cinema. Joe's next-door neighbour, young and bored housewife Evelyn kisses him in an attempt to start an affair. He later goes to her house, where she kisses him again and removes his trousers before her unsuspecting husband returns home. The next day, Joe bumps into a popular but quirky girl his own age from town, Ruth. She invites him back to her parents' house and he accepts, leaving Boots alone and angry. Joe is impressed by Ruth's affluent home and her parents' record collection. Ruth applies make up to Joe's face, making him resemble Bryan Ferry. They dance to If There Is Something by Roxy Music before Ruth asks him out on a date.

The following day, Evelyn convinces Joe to come into her home on the way to his date and they have sex. Joe arrives late to meet Ruth, who has been kept company by Boots. Ruth sees love bites from Evelyn on Joe's neck and storms off. Joe tries denying his affair with Evelyn, but ends up fighting with Boots who punches him. The next day, Evelyn apologizes for making him late but admits she enjoyed their lovemaking and asks if he wants to repeat it. She forces her daughter Jane out to play so they can have the house to themselves. While they have sex, Jane finds a washed up sea mine and climbs on it, causing it to detonate and kill her instantly. Joe blames himself, runs away on the day of Jane's funeral and doesn't return.

Back in the present, Joe wakes up as he is washed ashore. He returns to England to attend Boots' funeral but he is too late. His mother and Aunt tell him that Boots married Ruth and that he died of an aneurysm, leaving behind four young children and a lot of debt. Joe is taken by Jesse to the church graveyard to meet Ruth. She tells him how much she loved Boots and what a wonderful person he was but she cannot cry, even though it is the saddest moment of her life. Joe also spots graves belonging to Jane and Evelyn. Jesse tells him that Evelyn's marriage broke down after Jane died and she married a man who beat her. Evelyn later found the courage to leave but was killed in a car accident. Joe goes back to the house he purchased for his family when his career was going well. He listens to the same music he and Ruth listened to on the night they first met and decides to write her a cheque to clear the debt. He encloses with the cheque a letter, containing the lyrics to If There is Something. When Jesse gives it to her, Ruth initially refuses but finds the lyrics and breaks down crying. Brought down to earth by Boot's death and Ruth's grief, Joe returns to Los Angeles where he is met by Ophelia and hopes to start his career afresh.

Cast
 Daniel Craig as adult Joe Scot
 Harry Eden as young Joe Scot
 Claire Forlani as adult Ruth
 Felicity Jones as young Ruth
 Emilia Fox as Sister Jean
 Eve as Ophelia Franklin
 Jodhi May as Evelyn Adams
 Miriam Karlin as Mrs. Rogers
 Helen McCrory as Peggy Tickell
 James D'Arcy as Jack Adams
 Mark Strong as Mannie Miesel
 Olivia Williams as Grace Scot
 Julie Ordon as Carrie Ann
 Gina Athans as Apple
 Max Deacon as Young Boots McKay
 Jodie Tomlinson as Jane Adams
 Keeley Hawes as Jesse Scot
 Mia Clifford as Young Jesse Scot

Production
The film was mainly shot in Cape Town in South Africa, and England. Flashbacks of a Fool was director Baillie Walsh's first feature film. Walsh had directed music videos for, among others, Massive Attack, Oasis and INXS. The cinematography for the film was done by John Mathieson, who shot for films such as Gladiator, Matchstick Men and Kingdom of Heaven.

Reception
Review aggregator Rotten Tomatoes reports a 38% approval rating based on 21 reviews, with an average rating of 4.54/10. The site's critics consensus reads: "Despite Daniel Craig's earnest efforts, Flashbacks of a Fool suffers from an ambitious but underdeveloped script".

References

External links
 
 
 
 

2008 films
2008 drama films
British drama films
Films about actors
2008 directorial debut films
2000s English-language films
2000s British films